Think It Over is a 2002 Greek comedy film directed by Katerina Evangelakou. It was selected as the Greek entry for the Best Foreign Language Film at the 76th Academy Awards, but it was not nominated.

Cast
 Mania Papadimitriou as Maraki
 Ivonni Maltezou as Ioulia
 Christos Stergioglou as Menis
 Lena Kitsopoulou as Anthoula

See also
 List of submissions to the 76th Academy Awards for Best Foreign Language Film
 List of Greek submissions for the Academy Award for Best International Feature Film

References

External links
 

2002 films
2002 comedy films
Greek comedy films
2000s Greek-language films